A Child Is Born is an album of Christmas carols by pianist Geri Allen with vocalists recorded in 2011 and released on the Motéma label.

Reception 

AllMusic awarded the album 4 stars, stating, "this is a holiday collection for the more adventurous jazz piano fan, rather than for someone looking for a safe, warm, and fuzzy set of jazzed-up Christmas tunes". The Guardian review by John Fordham awarded the album 3 stars, noting, "Wherever you're coming from, this remains the work of a gifted improviser exploring timelessly haunting songs". PopMatters reviewer Josh Langhoff said, "Geri Allen’s mostly-solo, mostly-jazz-piano album A Child Is Born flows through traditional Christmas songs and hymns with much facility, some invention, and a couple of surprises"

Track listing 
All compositions Traditional except where noted.

 "Angels We Have Heard On High" – 4:24
 "A Child Is Born" (Thad Jones, Alec Wilder) – 3:43
 "Imagining Gena at Sunrise" – 1:10
 "O Come, O Come, Emmanuel" – 7:31
 "Journey to Bethlehem" (Geri Allen) – 1:12
 "We Three Kings" (John Henry Hopkins, Jr." – 5:08
 "Little Drummer Boy" (Katherine Kennicott Davis) – 5:00
 "God Is With Us" (Allen) – 2:16
 "Amazing Grace" (John Newton/Traditional) – 2:43
 "Christmas Medley: Away in a Manger/What Child Is This?/Silent Night" (Traditional/William Chatterton Dix/Franz Xaver Gruber) – 4:32
 "Imagining Gena At Sunset" – 0:32
 "Let Us Break Bread Together" – 5:00
 "It Came Upon a Midnight Clear" (Richard Storrs Willis) – 6:24
 "O Come, O Come, Emmanuel" – 0:56

Personnel 
Geri Allen – Fazioli piano, celeste, Farfisa organ, Fender Rhodes electric piano, Hohner clavinet
Carolyn Brewer (tracks 5 & 8), Connaitre Miller (track 8), Barbara Roney (track 8) – vocals
Farah Jasmine Griffin – spoken word (track 5)
Women Of the Gee's Bend Quilt Collective sampled and engineered by Jaimeo Brown (track 4)

References 

2011 Christmas albums
Geri Allen albums
Motéma Music albums
Christmas albums by American artists
Jazz Christmas albums
Vocal jazz albums